Davender S. Malik is an Indian American mathematician and professor of mathematics and computer science at Creighton University.

Education
Malik attended the University of Delhi in New Delhi, India, receiving his bachelor's and master's degrees in mathematics, where he won the Prof. Ram Behari Gold Medal in 1980 for his high marks.  Then at the University of Waterloo in Ontario, Canada, he received a master's degree in pure mathematics.  In the United States, Malik went to Ohio University, earning an M.S. in computer science, and a Ph.D. in mathematics in 1985, writing his dissertation on "A Study of Q-Hypercyclic Rings."

Career
In 1985, Malik joined the faculty of Creighton University, teaching in the mathematics department.  In 2013 he became the first holder of the Frederick H. and Anna K. Scheerer Endowed Chair in Mathematics.  His research has focused on ring theory, abstract algebra, information science, and fuzzy mathematics, including fuzzy automata theory, fuzzy logic, and applications of fuzzy set theory in other disciplines.

In the academic community, Malik has been a member of the American Mathematical Society and Phi Kappa Phi.  Within his community, co-created a Creighton program in which faculty help area high school students pursue scientific research, to be published in their own student journal.

Malik has published more than 45 papers and 18 books.  He has created a computer science line of textbooks that includes extensive and complete programming examples, exercises, and case studies throughout using programming languages such as C++ and Java.

Books
The books he has written include:
Programming
 C++ Programming: From Problem Analysis to Program Design (1st ed., 2002; 8th ed. 2017)
 C++ Programming: Program Design Including Data Structures (1st ed., 2002; 8th ed. 2017)
 Data Structures Using C++ (1st ed., 2003; 2nd ed. 2010)
 Data Structures Using Java (2003)
 Java programming: From Problem Analysis to Program Design (1st ed., 2003; 5th ed. 2012)
 Java programming: Program Design including Data structures (2006)
 Java programming: Guided Learning With Early Objects (2009)
 Introduction to C++ Programming, Brief Edition (2009)
Mathematics
 Fundamentals of Abstract Algebra (1997)
 Fuzzy Commutative Algebra (1998)
 Fuzzy Discrete Structures (2000)
 Fuzzy Mathematics in Medicine (2000)
 Fuzzy Automata and Languages: Theory and Applications (2002)
 Fuzzy Semigroups (2003)
 Application of Fuzzy Logic to Social Choice Theory (2015)

References

External links
 Faculty webpage at Creighton University

20th-century American mathematicians
21st-century American mathematicians
Algebraists
American textbook writers
American male writers of Indian descent
Creighton University faculty
Indian emigrants to the United States
20th-century Indian mathematicians
1958 births
Living people
Mathematics educators
Ohio University alumni
Science and technology studies scholars
Delhi University alumni
University of Waterloo alumni
American male non-fiction writers